Tom in America is a short film directed by Flavio Alves and starring Academy Award nominees Burt Young and Sally Kirkland. The story centers around the life of a married elderly man living in a Long Island suburb of New York City who, while rummaging through trash in search of things to sell at the local flea market, finds a Tom of Finland doll that triggers a long-ignored impulse.

Cast
 Burt Young as Michael
 Sally Kirkland as Betty
 Jacques Mitchell as Tom
 Alex Kruz as Gus
 Dawn Young as Michele
 Denise Hungerford as Suzanne
 Michael J. Cannon as Chuck
 Steve Brustien as Doctor Hesse
 Erika Woods as Weather Woman
 Scott Schafer as Small Man
 Mitch Giannunzio as Big Man
 Eddie Sass III as Young Michael
 Wendy Callard-Booz as Old Woman

Release
Tom in America had its world premiere at the 20th Palm Springs International Film Festival in June 2014.

References

External links
 
 
 

2014 films
2014 romantic drama films
American romantic drama films
Films set in New York City
Films shot in New York City
Kickstarter-funded films
Films directed by Flavio Alves
2010s English-language films
2010s American films